Frederick Kemmelmeyer (c. 1755 - c. 1821) was a German-born American painter. He was entirely self-taught and his work is generally classified as folk art.

Biography
His approximate birth year has been established through census records, but no birth certificate or baptismal record has been found. Naturalization papers in Annapolis, Maryland, dating from 1788, list a Frederick Kimmelmeiger, who is assumed to be him, although it is not known when or why he came to the United States. Speculation has centered around a Friedrich Kimmelmeyer who served as a medic with the Hessians during the Revolution, deserted to the Americans, and was briefly married in South Carolina, but no firm connection has been made.

Soon after becoming a citizen, he placed advertisements in the Maryland Gazette and the Baltimore Advertiser, offering his services as a drawing instructor, a painter of miniatures and a sign painter. Many of his early works are copies of European lithographs and engravings.

He remained in Baltimore until 1803, when he became an itinerant portrait painter. Over the next fourteen years, his travels can be traced through his advertisements, beginning in Alexandria, Virginia, where he opened a school. Shortly after, he relocated to Georgetown. Several of his paintings from that period are portraits of George Washington or scenes from battles that feature him. By 1805, he appears to have been in Hagerstown, then went a bit further, to Chambersburg, Pennsylvania. This was followed, in 1810, by advertisements in Winchester, Virginia. Two years later, he taught and painted in what is now West Virginia. His last known advertisement appeared in 1816, in Hagerstown. A combination of age and alcoholism apparently had a serious negative effect on his ability to paint.

His last years are largely undocumented. Only eleven portraits have been positively identified as his.

References

Further reading

External links

1750s births
1820s deaths
18th-century American painters
18th-century American male artists
American portrait painters
German emigrants to the United States
19th-century American painters
19th-century American male artists
American male painters
Painters from Maryland
Painters from Virginia
Folk artists